Acacia spathulifolia commonly known as Gold carpet or the Gold carpet wattle is a shrub of the genus Acacia and the subgenus Phyllodineae that is endemic to coastal parts of western Australia.

Description
It has glabrous or puberulous branchlets. Like most species of Acacia it has phyllodes rather than true leaves. The glabrous phyllodes are longitudinally wrinkled and a green to yellow-green colour with distinct yellow coloured marginal nerves. It blooms profusely from June to October and produces yellow flowers. It produces inflorescences the occur mostlysingly and have spherical flower-heads with a diameter of  that are sub-densley packed with 9 to 15 golden coloured flowers. Following flowering crustaceous to coriaceous brown coloured seed pods for that have a narrowly oblong shape.

Taxonomy
The species was first formally described by the botanist Bruce Maslin in 1978 as part of the work Studies in the genus Acacia - The taxonomy of some diaphyllodinous species s published in the journal Nuytsia. It was reclassified as Racosperma spathulifolium by Leslie Pedley in 2003 then transferred back to genus Acacia in 2006.

Distribution
It is native to an area in the Mid West, Wheatbelt and Gascoyne regions of Western Australia where it is commonly situated on sandplains and around areas of coastal limestone growing in sandy soils. The range of the plant extends from around Cape Range National Park in the north south along the coast through Kalbarri and Jurien where it is far more common. It is found as far as Mullewa and Piawaning in the east and is usually a part of coastal heath, low woodland and shrubland communities.

Cultivation
The spoon shaped foliage and golden flowers make the plant an ideal feature groundcover.

See also
 List of Acacia species

References

spathulifolia
Acacias of Western Australia
Taxa named by Bruce Maslin
Plants described in 1978